Alin Florian Buleică (born 12 September 1991) is a Romanian footballer who plays as a midfielder for Liga II side Dinamo București.

One of the highlights of his career happened while playing for  Pandurii, during the 2013-2014 Europa League, when his goal contributed decisively to Pandurii defeating  Braga and qualifying for the group stage that year.

Honours
Gaz Metan CFR Craiova
 Liga III: 2008–09

References

External links
 
 

1991 births
Living people
Sportspeople from Craiova
Romanian footballers
Association football midfielders
Romania under-21 international footballers
Liga I players
Liga II players
FC U Craiova 1948 players
FC Petrolul Ploiești players
CS Pandurii Târgu Jiu players
FC Universitatea Cluj players
CS Concordia Chiajna players
FC UTA Arad players
FC Argeș Pitești players
AFC Turris-Oltul Turnu Măgurele players
ACS Viitorul Târgu Jiu players
FC Dinamo București players